is a Japanese professional footballer who plays as a forward for WE League club Tokyo Verdy Beleza. She made her WE League debut on 16 October 2021.

Career statistics

Club

International

Honours 
Tokyo Verdy Beleza

 Empress's Cup: 2022

Japan U20

 FIFA U-20 Women's World Cup runner-up: 2022

References 

Japanese women's footballers
Living people
Nippon TV Tokyo Verdy Beleza players
Women's association football forwards
WE League players
2004 births